Crisis Control is a BBC children's game show.

The show is presented by 'The Commander', played by Garry Robson. Each week there is a major world crisis, such as a tsunami, killer disease, or volcano. Children acting as cadets compete as teams (Green and Orange Cadets) in different tests to earn stars. The rescue is co-ordinated from a high-tech emergency response control centre. The last test is usually a physical activity. The winning cadets gain 'Crisis Control's ultimate accolade', the Golden Emblem. The runners up get the Silver Emblem.

The show was shown on Fridays at 4:30pm on the CBBC Channel in early 2009 but has not been broadcast since then.

External links
 

Crisis Control on UKGameshows

BBC children's television shows
2009 British television series debuts
2009 British television series endings
2000s British children's television series
British children's game shows
2000s British game shows
English-language television shows